The Sortie Made by the Garrison of Gibraltar (also called The Sortie made by the Garrison of Gibraltar in the Morning of the 27 of November 1781) is a 1789 oil-on-canvas painting by  American artist John Trumbull. The painting shows a key point in Gibraltar's history when the Great Siege of Gibraltar was undertaken by the Spanish against the British at Gibraltar in November 1781. The Spanish officer Don Jose de Barboza is being given respect as he lies dying. Although left behind by his own retreating troops, he still unsuccessfully attacked the British troops with chivalry.

Background

The painting is based on a historic battle that took place in Gibraltar on November 27, 1781. The Great Siege of Gibraltar was an unsuccessful attempt by Spain and France to capture Gibraltar from the British during the War of American Independence.

Painting

The painting depicts the events of the night of November 26, 1781, when British troops made a sudden attack (sortie) against the enemy batteries. The death of the Spanish officer Don Jose de Barboza is the focal point of the painting. He fell mortally wounded and died near his post refusing assistance after having been abandoned by his troops. He is portrayed as rejecting the aid of General George Eliott, commander of the British troops.

In 1782, the siege was lifted, and Trumbull's friend Antonio de Poggi, an artist and dealer based in London who had been in the besieged garrison, told him of an earlier incident, which had occurred in November 1781.
This had all the ingredients he sought:

Furthermore, Trumbull had been engaged in a series of paintings based on the American Revolution, which had been criticized in London. He saw the subject of the Siege as one which he could demonstrate that he supported British heroism as well:

Trumbull labored on the composition, over many sketches and three large completed canvases. As the project progressed, Trumbull's ambitions for it to be his big breakthrough to major patronage grew too. He refused large offers for the picture, preferring to exhibit it privately for admission fees.

Horace Walpole, 4th Earl of Orford had called the painting:

The painting is depicted on the back of the 2010 Gibraltar 10-pound note.

The people highlighted in this composition are the dying José de Barboza and to his right and from left to right: Ensign A?. Mackenzie (in Highland dress), Governor Eliott, Lt G.F. Koehler, Lt.Col J. Hardy, Brig. Gen C. Ross, Capt A. Witham, Capt Roger Curtis, Lieutent Thomas Trigge, Lt Colonel Hugo.

Notes

References

1789 paintings
Paintings about the American Revolution
Paintings in the collection of the Metropolitan Museum of Art
Paintings by John Trumbull
1781 in Gibraltar